Alpha Rho Upsilon ( in Greek, ARU in Latin/English; pronounced A-roo) was a fraternity at Bowdoin College in Brunswick, Maine, from 1946 until it was disbanded in 1990. Until then it occupied a late Victorian wood-frame house at 238 Maine Street.

Founding and history
An offshoot of the Thorndike Club, a dining club formed in 1937 for non-fraternity students at the college, ARU was founded in 1946 by a group of Bowdoin students, who included World War II veterans, in reaction to the exclusion of Jewish and African American students from the other campus fraternities at the time. The letters ARU stood for "All Races United," and they lived up to their name by, for example, sponsoring a Japanese student in 1951. History Professor Ernst Christian Helmreich was the faculty adviser to the Thorndike Club from 1937–1946. German Professor Fritz Carl August Koelln was the fraternity's long-time faculty adviser. Recognizing the discriminatory practices of the fraternity system of that era against African American and Jewish students, Professors Helmreich and Koelln played significant roles in the formation of ARU as a fraternity that welcomed students of all religions and ethnic backgrounds into its fellowship. That the Thorndike Club and, hence, ARU came into existence is a testament to the sadness of the family of man divided on the basis of skin color, ethnicity or religious belief. The meaning of ARU was never lost by its Brothers.

ARU initially resided in Moore Hall, one of Bowdoin's dormitories, then moved to a former faculty housing hall at 264 Maine Street before purchasing their 238 Maine Street home from the Sigma Nu fraternity.

An architectural hybrid of Colonial Revival and the Shingle Style featuring Palladian windows, gambrels, peaked dormers and a balconied front porch with Ionic columns, the ARU house was built between 1894 and 1900 as the residence of George Taylor and Edith Davis Files. An 1889 Bowdoin graduate, George Files was a German professor at the college until his death in 1919 upon returning from France, where he had helped the YMCA with the war effort. In 1921, Mrs. Files endowed the George Taylor Files Professorship in Modern Languages at Bowdoin and sold their house to Sigma Nu, who in turn sold it to ARU in 1951 upon relocating to the college's present Hartley Cone Baxter House.  The "new wing" was added in the rear by 1965 with six double rooms and two bathrooms.

The other college-sanctioned fraternities at Bowdoin were local chapters of national fraternities that opposed admission of "minorities" and women to their ranks.  Bowdoin first admitted women as freshmen in 1971, but admitted women as exchange students, and then transfers, starting in 196? NEED DATE. ARU voted to become co-ed immediately when women were first female exchange students were accepted, and many joined ARU.  Bowdoin's first woman graduate, transfer Susan Jacobs '70, is an ARU.

Governance
The ARU Executive Board, elected by popular vote of the fraternity members, comprised a President, Vice President, Treasurer, Social Chairman, Recording Secretary, Corresponding Secretary, Steward, Freshman Orientation Chairman, Guest Night Chairman and Historian. In honor of the fraternity's World War II veteran origins, coinciding with the "Flyers" nickname (see below), the Executive Board was informally called the Strategic Air Command, and its first six positions were nicknamed Pilot, Co-pilot, Navigator, Tailgunner, Log Keeper and Radioman, respectively. Each elected official gave his/her own report at the fraternity's weekly house meetings. For a period in the early 1970s into the mid-1980s there was an ad hoc "Joint Chiefs" committee.

Activities and traditions
Annual ARU activities and traditions included:
 Work Week, the week prior to the start of a new school year, when fraternity members arrived early to clean and prep the house for Rush Week.
 Rush Week, the week before college classes began, when all fraternities sought new members from the incoming freshman class by holding open-invitation parties at their houses. Selected freshmen were invited to join a fraternity by receiving "bids" from its underclassmen, by consent of the entire membership.
 Drop Night, when fraternities held dress-up banquets to welcome new members, who would join by showing up at the fraternity they had chosen.
 Hell Night, ARU's new-member initiation, which included a comically spooky ritual in which each new member was asked questions about why they joined ARU, what they planned to contribute to it, etc.
 Sacrifice of the Virgin Pumpkin, a purification ceremony that non-believers may have viewed as a Halloween costume parade around campus.  At the high point of the event, a senior class member designated as "High Priest", chosen by his predecessor, ritually sacrificed the Virgin Pumpkin - one not tainted by commercialism and procured illicitly - by casting it from ARU's front, second story balcony onto the granite carriage step (removed during street reconstruction) next to the Maine Street curb, smashing the Pumpkin into pieces. A sherry reception (Harvey's Bristol Cream) followed. The rite started in reaction to a notorious event that occurred in the House in the mid-1960s that almost caused the House to be closed.  The Sacrifice warded off the evils that almost destroyed the House. In 1971, a brother composed a processional hymn for the Sacrifice to the tune of an old Yiddish song: "Holy and pure virgin pumpkin, solemn we follow thee / Holy and pure virgin pumpkin, solemn we follow thee / Fertile, undefiled, regal in satin clad / Blessed vegetable in the ninth year of the bag."  (The "ninth year of the bag" would indicate that the Sacrifice dated back to 1962; presumably, the hymn composer had done some research.)  The emphasis of the Sacrifice ceremony was on purity.  The High Priest, in particular, needed exceptional pureness.  English majors were preferred, although majors in other pure subjects, such as Classics, Religion, and Math, were looked on favorably.  The High Priest would consult with other seniors before selecting his successor from the junior class.  The other celebrants, also selected carefully, were the Pumpkin Bearer, who carried the Blessed Vegetable on a silk pillow, and two Guards who ritualistically defended the entire procession and ceremony from the insults and attacks of the Devil's Advocate.  All ARU's were expected to participate in the ceremony by first getting as purified as possible at the house.  At about 1130 pm the High Priest and his entourage would don their mystical vestments.  All the other Ru's would at least throw a sheet over their shoulders.  The procession crossed Maine Street and went to the Chapel steps for the Consecration of the Virgin.  The priest then led the devoted to the Walker steps where he delivered an Oratory.  The procession then returned to Chapel Walk and crossed to block Maine Street while the High Priest, Pumpkin Bearer, and Guards ascended to the balcony over the front porch.  Raising the Blessed Vegetable over his head, the High Priest would shout something profound (Chris Gahran in '73: "Cancel my rumba lessons!") as he threw the Chaste Gourd to the ground to the acclaim of the faithful, now assured that ARU was protected from untoward events for another year.  Light refreshments and further purification followed.
 The Art Exhibit, where members showed off their creations. A team of judges picked a winner.
 The Butterman, the annual mysterious appearance of a pat of butter on a structural component of the dining hall (a ceiling beam, etc.) with no fraternal knowledge of who put it there.
 Beethoven's Birthday, an interfaith winter holiday party for members and invited guests, which included a "Secret Santa" gift exchange. The event originally started as a celebration of the founding of the House, which occurred close to Beethoven's Birthday.  Beethoven's evolved into a "formal" party.  The Ru's dressed up and Beethoven symphonies played on the downstairs sound system.  The faculty were cordially invited to a good dinner and to partake of an open bar.  ARU's bar was acknowledged as the best on campus, and many faculty attended.  President Howell was a regular.  This event served the dual purpose of a chance to blow off steam before first-semester finals while simultaneously brown-nosing the faculty.
 Mr. ARU, a talent contest where selected contestants presented comic acts, song-and-dance acts, etc., vying for the "Mr. ARU" and "Mr. Congeniality" prizes.
 The Prom, a dance for members and their in-house or guest dates.
 Shot-A-Minute, a drinking contest to see who could down the most shots of beer without vomiting, running to the bathroom, etc. Each contestant drank one shot-glass full of beer per minute until s/he could hold no more.  These contests were held in the dining room.  The equitable and humanitarian "one go, no blow" rule was added to allow a contestant to use the "new wing" john to relieve him/herself, once, so long as s/he constantly blew a whistle from the house Risk game.  This assured that the "no blow" part of the rule was observed.
 The St. Patty's Day Drinkoff, a celebration of St. Patrick's Day (March 17) in the form of a drinking contest or free-for-all boozefest.
  Les Biens, This was the name of ARU's intra-fraternity teams in the early 1970s. It was meant as a parody of Les Owls from the Psi Upsilon (Psi U) fraternity down the street.  Of course, it merely looked like it would translate from French to "The Goods."
 The Green Hornet Construction Company, on-campus construction project on May 4 akin to MIT's "hacking" tradition. It evolved from something spontaneous to a more formal project to commemorate some key event on campus at the time. The first project in 1965 was the construction of a temple using smudge pot lanterns and the granite curb stones to be placed along Twelve Rod Road now named Park Row. As it evolved, the projects were sometimes pre-assembled in the confines of the fraternity house. In the dead of night and as silently as possible, construction took place on the Quad. At completion, the Company retreated to the fraternity house "buzzing" in unison. Then, with the aid of liquid refreshment, the Bill was written for submission to the Dean of the College. By agreement with the Dean circa 1969, the project could stand for one day and was disassembled by the Company during the next night. Some of the projects were:-1970, The Lake Bowdoin Recreation Facility was constructed to take advantage of the spring flooding of the quad, -1971, Piippo Hall, The first newly constructed women's dormitory named after Mrs. Piippo, the ubiquitous administrative secretary. -1973, Will Hughes Pre-Med Memorial Cemetery, to commemorate the failure of many promising freshmen in an intro science class.  The "Green Hornet Society" at contemporary Bowdoin continues the Green Hornet Construction Company's tradition albeit with costumed revelers and in the light of day.
 Various campus-wide parties and coffeehouses, some in conjunction with Bowdoin's annual Parents' Day, Winter's Weekend and Ivies Weekend celebrations. Parents' Weekend in particular was another occasion when the quality of ARU's bar impressed guests.
 The Hurtdance Corporation Presents, a weekly or biweekly typed recap of unusually funny or off-the-wall events, happenings, actions or quotes members said or did in the house over that one or two weeks. A "hurtdance" is an ultimate all-nighter in which a student attempts to complete an unusually large amount of procrastinated schoolwork in one night. The initial letters of The Hurtdance Corporation were THC, an ingredient in marijuana.
 Ralph Adolph (or Adolf), the fictitious ARU Brother whose home address was 727&1/2(?) Boylston Street, Boston.  Ralph received magazines to which the fraternity subscribed.  He also became the President of the Green Hornet Construction Company.
 Charles Paisley, another fictitious ARU Brother, named for a character in Monty Python's "The Piranha Brothers" sketch, whom a non-member posed as on the fraternity's 1979 composite picture. At many special dinners such as Beethoven's Birthday and Winter's Weekend, "a toast to Charles Paisley" was proposed.
 ARU Flyers, a derogatory nickname embraced by ARUs in the late 60's-early 70's. A flyer was defined by one brother of the era as "one whose feet are firmly planted in mid-air."
 The ARU Runway, annually the tarmacked walkway across the park separating Twelve Rod Road from Maine Street that led to ARU was painted for the ARU Flyers landing benefit as they returned to the fraternity house.
 Defenestration, the act of tossing a fraternity member out of a first-floor window for unbecoming conduct of one kind or another.
  Sock-a-Nuck's Heroes of the Week, in the early 1970s, two fraternity brothers recognized people (or things) who demonstrated valor (or not).  This evolved into a weekly Heroes List, posted every Monday by the semi-secret Heroes List Editor, naming the ten most Heroic ARU's of the previous week or weekend accompanied by the editor's summary of the outstanding exploits of each Hero.  Editorial discernment was important.  Legends were born, especially when hither-to unnoticed freshmen vaulted into stardom. 
 Senior Night, an end-of-the-year banquet where the graduating members received roasts from underclassmen and gave farewell speeches. Awards presented at the banquet included: Freshman of the Year, determined by the Executive Board; Outstanding Junior, chosen by the senior class; the Kitchen Help Award, given by the Steward; the Trashmouth Award, for creativity in the use of expletives; and the Log Keeper's award, for the member mentioned the most often (some years, the least often) in Log Keeper's reports at house meetings.

"Freshmen Raid" and "Freshman Prank" were designed to inculcate brotherhood among the incoming class.  The Raid required the frosh to plan a secret, middle-of-night attack to take control of the House, waking up upper-classmen by tying them in their beds or locking them in their rooms or such.  The Prank involved a trick played elsewhere on campus, and ideally would add to the reputation for zaniness that ARU enjoyed.  Stealing TD's front door and stealing all the toilet seats at the Zate house were examples.  Both houses got back their missing items, and ARU's reputation for crazy stunts was polished.

ARU also established a college-wide award, the James Bowdoin Cup, given annually to a distinguished scholar-athlete at the school.

Dissolution
Arrears with the college forced ARU's closing in 1990, which initiated the conversion of all of Bowdoin's fraternities into a system of college-owned social houses, in which entering students are assigned a "college house" affiliation correlating with their first-year dormitory. Each house was thus renamed after a distinguished alumnus of said fraternity. The ARU fraternity house was renamed Helmreich House after Bowdoin history and political-science professor Ernst Christian Helmreich, the faculty adviser to the Thorndike Club. His grandsons, James '81 and Alan '83, were also members.

Distinguished alumni
Other distinguished ARU alumni include author & reporter Gordon Weil '54, Judge Berle M. Schiller '65, Congressman Tom Andrews '75, noted economist Larry Lindsey '76, opera singer Kurt Ollmann '77, and science fiction writer Walter H. Hunt '81.

External links
 Bowdoin College
 Account of the founding of Alpha Rho Upsilon by one of the founding members

References

Defunct fraternities and sororities
Fraternities and sororities in the United States
Student organizations established in 1946
1946 establishments in Maine